Peter Jacobson (born March 24, 1965) is an American actor. He is best known for his portrayal of Dr. Chris Taub on the Fox medical drama series House. He also starred on the USA Network science fiction drama Colony as former Proxy Snyder.

Early life
Jacobson was born in Chicago, Illinois, the son of Lynn Straus and news anchor Walter Jacobson. His family is Jewish, coming from Russia, Ukraine and, possibly, Lithuania. He is a 1987 graduate of Brown University. Jacobson also graduated from the Juilliard School, where he was a member of the drama division's Group 20 (1987–1991).

Career
Jacobson and Lisa Edelstein, his future co-star on House, appeared as a couple eating at a restaurant in the 1997 film As Good as It Gets. He appeared twice on Law & Order as Randy Dworkin, a jovial crusading defense attorney. In 2005, he played Jimmy in the Academy Award-nominated film Good Night, and Good Luck. He has appeared in Scrubs, CSI: Miami, The Lost Room, The Starter Wife, Transformers, Colony, and The Midnight Meat Train.

Jacobson joined the cast of House as Dr. Chris Taub, a plastic surgeon hoping to secure a place on Dr. Gregory House's diagnostics team. In October 2007, he was confirmed as a regular on the show. He made a guest appearance as Alan on an episode of the USA Network's Royal Pains.

Filmography

Film

Television

Video games

References

External links
 
 

1965 births
20th-century American male actors
21st-century American male actors
American male film actors
American male television actors
American male voice actors
American people of Lithuanian-Jewish descent
American people of Russian-Jewish descent
American people of Ukrainian-Jewish descent
Brown University alumni
Jewish American male actors
Juilliard School alumni
Living people
Male actors from Chicago
21st-century American Jews